Ciénega Bridge is an open-spandrel arch bridge which crosses Ciénega Creek and the Union Pacific Railroad near Vail, Arizona. Originally constructed in 1921, the bridge was part of U.S. Route 80, a major transcontinental highway, from 1926 to 1956. Being the oldest bridge of its kind in Arizona, the Ciénega Bridge is listed on the National Register of Historic Places. Currently, the bridge carries Marsh Station Road.

History
In 1920, the Arizona Highway Department began construction on a section of the Borderland Highway in southeastern Arizona. The Borderland Highway was part of the larger Dixie Overland Highway, Bankhead Highway and Old Spanish Trail auto trails, which were important early transcontinental highways. The Highway Department received financial aid for the project from the federal government under Federal Aid Project Number 18 as well as a Pima County bond issue and the Cochise County Road Fund. As part of the highway construction, the Highway Department needed to build a large bridge over a chasm known as Ciénega Canyon, a natural feature of Ciénega Creek, near the town of Vail. Running parallel through the canyon with the creek was the main line of the Southern Pacific Railroad (now part of the Union Pacific Railroad). State engineers decided to design an open-spandrel concrete arch bridge to cross the canyon. The arch would measure  in length and would be a combination of two tapered ribs connecting the foundation arch to the bridge deck, supplemented by multiple concrete columns, supporting the deck. Paneled bulkheads and concrete guard rails would be placed on the sides of the bridge deck. The part of the bridge spanning the railroad would be a two span section with three piers supported by a concrete girder structure. In total, the bridge would have 5 spans, with four being approach spans. The main architect of the bridge was state engineer Merrill Butler. The exact location of the bridge was chosen due to it being the most feasible area to the place the bridge as well as the high solid rocky banks providing added support.

Upon finalizing the bridge design, the Highway Department awarded construction of the bridge to a Tucson based firm called English and Pierce. Construction materials would be provided by the Highway Department. The new bridge was internally referred to as "Section F" of the Borderland Highway construction project. Construction of Ciénega Bridge started in 1920. Over  of rock had to be blasted to make way for the bridge foundations. Erecting of the false work was a risky endeavor, as the contractors had to deal with the possibility of high water levels generated by the creek. Due to a dispute with the contractor, construction of the bridge was taken over completed by the Highway Department. The Highway Department claimed English and Pierce exceeded the original contracted price necessitating state takeover. Construction of the bridge was completed in March 1921 at a total cost of $40,000. Starting in 1926, the Borderland Highway was designated as part of U.S. Route 80, a transcontinental highway which stretched from Tybee Island, Georgia to San Diego, California.

The Ciénega Bridge became a heavily traveled section of US 80 which had gained a dangerous reputation by the 1950s, becoming one of the most dangerous roads in the state of Arizona. Between 1952 and 1955, 11 people were killed in different car accidents on the bridge. The route leading to the bridge included an eight degree downhill curve just before the foot of the concrete structure. The bridge itself was an over  drop above the creek. Construction started in 1952 on a bypass route which included a new railroad underpass and two wash bridges. The new straighter alignment opened on April 9, 1955, moving US 80 designation off Ciénega Bridge onto a newer bridge downstream. Upon the opening of the new route, ownership of the old bridge was transferred to Pima County. US 80 itself was replaced by Interstate 10 in 1977. The Ciénega Bridge was added to the National Register of Historic Places on September 30, 1988.

The majority of the bridge's structure remains unaltered, save for the guardrails, which were replaced by Jersey barriers in 1989. Although the guardrail replacement has slightly weakened the bridge's overall structural integrity, it does not pose a significant threat. The Ciénega Bridge is the oldest surviving open-spandrel arch bridge in Arizona.

Gallery

See also
 
 
 
 
 U.S. Route 80 in Arizona
 Ocean to Ocean Bridge
 Gillespie Dam Bridge
 List of bridges on the National Register of Historic Places in Arizona
 National Register of Historic Places listings in Pima County, Arizona

References

External links

Buildings and structures in Pima County, Arizona
Road bridges on the National Register of Historic Places in Arizona
National Register of Historic Places in Pima County, Arizona
Transportation in Pima County, Arizona
Bridges completed in 1921
1921 establishments in Arizona
Open-spandrel deck arch bridges in the United States
U.S. Route 80